The play-offs of the 2022 Billie Jean King Cup Europe/Africa Zone Group III were the final stages of the Group III zonal competition involving teams from Europe and Africa. Using the positions determined in their pools, the twenty-one teams faced off to determine their placing in the 2022 Billie Jean King Cup Europe/Africa Zone Group III. The top two teams advanced to Billie Jean King Cup Europe/Africa Zone Group II.

Promotional play-offs 
The first placed teams of each pool were drawn in head-to-head rounds. The winners advanced to Group II in 2023.

Semifinals

Morocco vs. Algeria

Ireland vs. Portugal

North Macedonia vs. Kosovo

Promotional play-offs

Bosnia and Herzegovina vs. Morocco

Portugal vs. North Macedonia

3rd place play-off (Skopje)

Ireland vs. Kosovo

4th–6th (Ulcinj) and 5th–8th (Skopje) place play-offs 
The second placed teams of each pool were drawn in head-to-head rounds to find the 4th–6th (Ulcinj) and 5th–8th (Skopje) placed teams.

Semifinals

Moldova vs. Cyprus

Malta vs. Iceland

Albania vs. South Africa

4th place play-off (Ulcinj)

Montenegro vs. Moldova

5th place play-off (Skopje)

Malta vs. South Africa

7th place play-off (Skopje)

Iceland vs. Albania

7th–9th (Ulcinj) and 9th–12th (Skopje) place play-offs 
The third placed teams of each pool were drawn in head-to-head rounds to find the 7th–9th (Ulcinj) and 9th–12th (Skopje) placed teams.

Semifinals

Ghana vs. Nigeria

Kenya vs. Botswana

Burundi vs. Seychelles

7th place play-off (Ulcinj)

Armenia vs. Ghana

9th place play-off (Skopje)

Botswana vs. Burundi

11th place play-off (Skopje)

Kenya vs. Seychelles

10th place play-offs 
The fourth placed teams of each pool in Ulcinj were drawn in a head-to-head round to find the 10th placed team.

Azerbaijan vs. Mauritius

13th place play-offs 
The fourth placed teams of each pool in Skopje were drawn in a head-to-head round to find the 13th placed team.

Uganda vs. Namibia

Final placements 

References

External links 
 Billie Jean King Cup website

P3